This was the first edition of the tournament.

Wildcard Danielle Collins won the title, defeating Sofya Zhuk in the final 2–6, 6–4, 6–3.

Seeds

Draw

Finals

Top half

Bottom half

Qualifying

Seeds

Qualifiers

Qualifying draw

First qualifier

Second qualifier

Third qualifier

Fourth qualifier

Fifth qualifier

Sixth qualifier

References
Main Draw
Qualifying Draw

Oracle Challenger Series – Newport Beach
Oracle Challenger Series - Newport Beach - Men's Singles